Nass El Ghiwane are a musical group established in 1970 in Casablanca, Morocco. The group, which originated in avant-garde political theater, has played an influential role in Moroccan chaabi (or shaabi).

Nass El Ghiwane were the first band to introduce Western instruments like the modern banjo. Their music incorporates a trance aesthetic, reflecting the influence of local gnawa music, and is inspired by ancient North African Sufi poetry, most prominently that of Abderrahman El Majdoub, whose work was a direct inspiration to the band. They are also credited for helping bring a new social movement to Morocco. The group was called “The Rolling Stones of Africa” by Martin Scorsese and was one of few Moroccan bands to receive international media attention.

Name 
In an interview with Al Bayan,  explained that, in Morocco, the term Nass El Ghiwane ( "people of song") refers to practitioners of the malhun musical tradition.

In film

The band is the focus of music documentary Trances, directed by Ahmed El Maanouni, who described Nass El Ghiwane as Morocco's soul music. Originally released in 1981, it was restored in 2007 by the World Cinema Foundation at Cineteca di Bologna /L’Immagine Ritrovata Laboratory. The film was picked specifically by Martin Scorsese for the World Cinema Foundation's first release and was screened at the Cannes Film Festival in 2007 and at Djemaa el-Fna square in Marrakesh, Morocco. The film has since been distributed by the Criterion Collection.

The band's song "Ya Sah" appears in the film The Last Temptation of Christ and on the associated album Passion – Sources. The film's director, Martin Scorsese, credits Nass El Ghiwane for opening a new universe to him.

Members

 Abdelaziz al-Tahiri: Founding member, replaced by Abderrahmane Paco in 1974
 Allal Yaala: Founding member, banjo player
 Boujmii Hgour: Singer, poet, composer. Founding member, played with the group until his death in 1974
 Larbi Batma: Actor, singer, percussionist. Founding member, played with the group until his death in 1997
 Omar Sayed: Singer, actor, percussion; founding member
 Abderrahmane "Paco" Kirouche: Singer, composer, played with the group until 1993
 Mohamed Akhdim 
 Raifak Redouane: 1991 to 2001
 Mahmoud Saadi: Left the group in the 1970s
 Rachid Batma: Singer, percussionist, since 1996
 Hamid Batma: Since 2000
 Abdelkrim Chifa: Since 2002

Discography
 Assallama 
 Hommage à Boudjemma
 Ya bani el-insan
 Ya Nass El Maana 
 Wannadi Ana
 Taghounja 
 Aali ou Khalli 
 Houde Ennaana 
 Soubhane Allah 
 A lotf Allah el khafi 
 Fine ghadi biya khouya
 Lebtana 
 Narjak Ana la M'chite 
 Ya saielni
 Mahmouma
 Oulad el Aalam
 L'jamra 
 Salama

Live albums
 Nass El Ghiwane Live Olympia 76 
 El ghaba – Live
 Echams Etalaa – Live Olympia 
 Nass el Ghiwane Live Casablanca 
 Nass el Ghiwane Live (feat. Boudjemaa)

Contributing artist
 Passion – Sources (1989, Real World Records)
 The Rough Guide to the Music of Morocco (2004, World Music Network)

References 

Moroccan musical groups
Musical groups established in 1970
People from Casablanca
1970s establishments in Morocco